Amalgamated Sons of Rest is the name of a one-off project by American songwriters Will Oldham and Jason Molina, along with Scottish colleague Alasdair Roberts. The collaboration yielded one eponymous EP, released in 2002 on Galaxia Records, and a song, "Translation", released by Jade Tree Records. "Translation" was not released under the Amalgamated Sons of Rest moniker, but under Molina's then-usual band name, Songs: Ohia, on a split EP with My Morning Jacket, though the songwriter credit is to "A.S. of R."

Track listing
 "Maa Bonny Lad"
 "My Donal"
 "The Gypsy He-Witch"
 "The Last House"
 "Major March"
 "Jennie Blackbird’s Blues"
 "I Will Be Good"

The last track, "I Will Be Good", is unlisted.

References
 Galaxia Records listing
 Listing on magnoliaelectricco.com

Amalgamated Sons of Rest albums
2002 EPs
Will Oldham